The 918th Aircraft Control and Warning Squadron is an inactive United States Air Force unit. It was last assigned to the Seattle Air Defense Sector, Air Defense Command, stationed at Baldy Hughes Air Station, British Columbia, Canada. It was inactivated on 1 March 1963.

The unit was a General Surveillance Radar squadron providing for the air defense of North America.

Lineage
 Constituted as 918th Aircraft Control and Warning Squadron
 Activated on 16 April 1952
 Discontinued and inactivated on 1 March 1963

Assignments
 Western Air Defense Force, 16 April 1952
 25th Air Division, 16 February 1953
 Seattle Air Defense Sector, 1 March 1960 - 1 March 1963

Stations
 Geiger Field, Washington, 16 April 1952
 Baldy Hughes Air Station, British Columbia, Canada, 1 June 1953 - 1 March 1963

References

 Cornett, Lloyd H. and Johnson, Mildred W., A Handbook of Aerospace Defense Organization  1946 - 1980,  Office of History, Aerospace Defense Center, Peterson AFB, CO (1980).

External links

Radar squadrons of the United States Air Force
Aerospace Defense Command units